Sorcerous Stabber Orphen is a Japanese anime series based on the light novel series of the same name written by Yoshinobu Akita and illustrated by Yuuya Kusaka. The original 1998 anime was broadcast in two seasons, with the first 24 episodes by J.C.Staff airing from October 3, 1998 to March 27, 1999 and the second season from October 2, 1999 to March 26, 2000 on TBS. The adaption follows the adventures of Krylancelo Finrandi now named Orphen as he seeks to free his close friend Azalie from her curse with his friends along Majic and Cleao.

The television series was licensed by ADV Films, who released the first season on DVD in 2001. Sorcerous Stabber Orphen 2: Revenge: The second anime series was released on DVD in North America in December 2003 by ADV Films. It is 23 episodes in length. In 2009, Sentai Filmworks released both seasons in an 8-disc DVD box set, and then in 2019 in a 2-disc SD Blu-ray set.

Series overview

Episode list

Season 1 (1998–1999)

Season 2: Revenge (1999–2000)

See also
 List of Sorcerous Stabber Orphen (2020 TV series) episodes

References

External links
 Orphen at Media Arts Database 
 Orphen Revenge at Media Arts Database 

Sorcerous Stabber Orphen (1998)